Lutak may refer to:
 Lutak, Alaska, United States
 Lutak, Iran, a village in Kerman Province, Iran
 Lutak (surname), Rusyn, Slovak and Ukrainian surname.